The 1975 Colorado Buffaloes football team was an American football team that represented the University of Colorado in the Big Eight Conference (Big 8) during the 1975 NCAA Division I football season. Led by second-year head coach Bill Mallory, the Buffaloes compiled a 9–2 regular season record (5–2 in Big 8, third), and played home games on campus at Folsom Field in Boulder, Colorado.

In the Astro-Bluebonnet Bowl, Colorado fell to ninth-ranked Texas to finish at 9–3. Ranked sixteenth in the final AP poll, the Buffaloes outscored their opponents 331 to 251.

Schedule

Personnel

References

External links
University of Colorado Athletics – 1975 football roster
Sports-Reference – 1975 Colorado Buffaloes

Colorado
Colorado Buffaloes football seasons
Colorado Buffaloes football